Andrea Casali (17 November 1705 – 7 September 1784) was an Italian painter of the Rococo period. He was also an art dealer in England. 

He was born in Civitavecchia in the Papal States and studied under Sebastiano Conca and Francesco Trevisani. Until 1738 he was a decorative painter of Roman churches and in 1729 was made a Knight of the Golden Spur; for this in England he would be called "the Chevalier Casali".  He travelled to England in 1741 and stayed there for twenty-five years.  He was a teacher to James Durno. Some sources erroneously claim a birthdate of 1720 (e.g., Bryan and Hobbes).  Among his English patrons were Thomas Coke, earl of Leicester (1697–1759), and Alderman William Beckford. He left England in 1766, after which he lived for some years at Rome, where he died in 1784.

Works
(partial list):

The Virgin and Child, after Raphael, etching, Fine Arts Museums of San Francisco
St. Edward the Martyr, Burton Constable Hall, East Riding of Yorkshire, United Kingdom
Lucretia lamenting her disgrace, 1761, Musée du Louvre, Paris
Innocence Triumphant, etching, Fine Arts Museums of San Francisco
Adoration of the Magi, 1750, Foundling Hospital Museum, London
Allegory of Autumn, c. 1760, Leeds Museums and Galleries, United Kingdom
Allegory of Summer, 1760, Holburne Museum of Art, Bath, United Kingdom
Portrait of Sir Charles Frederick, 1738, Ashmolean Museum, University of Oxford, United Kingdom
Lucrezia, Museum of Fine Arts, Budapest
Madonna del Rosario, 1731, Palazzo Vescovile, Rieti
Annunciazione and Adorazione dei Magi, 1738, Accademia Albertina, Turin
Lot ubriacato dalle figlie, collection privée, New York
Martirio di Santa Cristina, 1732, collegiata de Bolsena, Viterbo
Angelica e Medoro, Bemberg Fondation Toulouse
Bacco e Arianna, 1755, Grundy Art Gallery, Blackpool, United Kingdom
Galatea, Art Gallery, Glasgow, United Kingdom
Adorazione dei Magi, Staatsgalerie Stuttgart, Germany
Ercole e Onfale, private collection, Rome
Lot e le figlie and Susanna e i vecchioni, collection Lemme, Rome
Il banchetto di Antonio e Cleopatra, private collection, London
Ester e Assuero, collection Cei, Florence
Allegoria delle Arti e delle Scienze, Dyrham Park, South Gloucestershire, United Kingdom
Visione di San Felice di Valois and Scena della vita di San Michele, collection of the marquis de Lozoya, Madrid
Continenza di Scipione, Rhode Island School of Design Museum, New York, United States
San Giovanni Battista in preghiera, Ringling Museum, Sarasota Florida, United States
Marco Antonio e Cleopatra, royal palace of the Granja de San Ildefonso, Segovia, Spain
Portrait of Lady Anne Howard, 1759, Ingatestone, Essex, United Kingdom
William Beckford fanciullo, 1765, Hamilton collection, Scotland
Cristo morto compianto dagli angeli, 1737, Catedrale San Liberatore, Magliano Sabina, Rieti
La famiglia di Dario davanti Alessandro Magno, private collection, Amsterdam
Adorazione dell'agnello mistico da parte dei ventiquattro anziani dell'Apocalisse, 1735, Musée du Barocco, Palazzo Chigi, Ariccia

References

Laing, Alastair (March 1994). "Masterpieces from Yorkshire Houses". York City Art Gallery. The Burlington Magazine, p. 196.
Coen, Paolo, Il mercato dei dipinti a Roma nel diciottesimo secolo, 2 vols., Florence, Leo S. Olschki, 2010, (publishes the two auctions held by Casali in London and his inventory of goods]

1705 births
1784 deaths
People from Civitavecchia
18th-century Italian people
18th-century Italian painters
Italian male painters
Italian Baroque painters
Rococo painters
18th-century Italian male artists